Cheleken may refer to:

Cheleken Peninsula (formerly Cheleken Island), Turkmenistan
Former name of Hazar, Turkmenistan, a city in Balkan Province, Turkmenistan
, a Turkmen oil/gas drilling project